Lili Hinstin (born 10 July 1977 in France) is a French artistic director.

She was artistic director of the EntreVues Belfort International Festival and Locarno Film Festival.  

Lili Hinstin founded the production company Les Films du Saut du Tigre in 2001. From 2005 to 2009 she was a programmer for the French Academy in Rome – Villa Médicis, she was deputy artistic director for Cinéma du réel International Festival at Centre Pompidou from 2010 to 2013. From 2013 to 2018 she has been the artistic director of Entrevues Belfort International Film Festival.

From December 2018 to September 2020, she was the artistic director of the Locarno Film Festival.

In 2019, she was one of the two French women with Sidonie Dumas included in the third edition of Variety500, an index of the 500 most influential business leaders shaping the global media industry.

She is now part of the Organisation and Selection Committees of Villa Medici Film Festival in Rome Italy, which first edition was held in September 2021.

References

External links
 Locarno Festival Official Site
 EntreVues Belfort International Festival Official Site
 Lili Hinstin on France Culture
 Lili Hinstin on Filmadrid
 Lili Hinstin on Kritikat
 Lili Hinstin on IMDB
 Lili Hinstin on SRF
 Lili Hinstin on Variety

Living people
1977 births
French film producers
French artistic directors
Place of birth missing (living people)